The Anchorite's Cell (or Hermitage) is a small building overlooking The Groves, Chester, Cheshire, England.  It is recorded in the National Heritage List for England as a designated Grade II* listed building.

History

The structure was built in the middle of the 14th century as a religious retreat for a monk or a hermit.  It belonged to the nearby St John the Baptist's Church until the Reformation.  During the 19th century the building was restored and converted into a house.  In 1897 the porch of St Martin's Church, which was being demolished, was moved here and made into a north entrance.  The building was refurbished in about 1970 as a cottage.

Architecture

Standing on a sandstone outcrop that forms a plinth, the building is constructed in coursed sandstone, and has a grey slate roof.  It is in two storeys with the entrance on the north side. The porch has a segmental arch flanked by colonettes with trefoils in the spandrels, and a triple lancet window on the right side.  To the right of the porch is a two-light mullioned casement window, and a projecting stone chimney.  In the upper storey, above the porch, is a panel containing a triple lancet window.  To the right of this is another lancet window and the voussoirs of a blocked arch.  In the east end of the building is a segmental-arched window in the ground floor, a three-light mullioned window with intersecting tracery in the upper floor, and a coped gable.  At the west end is a high-level segmental-arched window in the ground floor, a buttress at the southwest corner, and a coped gable with a gabled finial.  There are more lancet windows in the south side.

See also

Grade II* listed buildings in Cheshire West and Chester

References

Grade II* listed buildings in Chester
Grade II* listed houses
Anchorite's Cell